Masayuki Fujio (藤尾 正行 Fujio Masayuki, January 1, 1917 – October 22, 2006) was the Japanese Minister of Education, under the government of Yasuhiro Nakasone until 1986. He was a member of the right-wing Seiwa Seisaku Kenkyūkai faction of the Liberal Democratic Party, where he was described as being a "loyal vassal" to Takeo Fukuda, the founder of the faction.

In 1986, he was made Minister of Education by Prime Minister Nakasone, but he was soon fired by Nakasone after an interview with Bungei Shunju in which he made several controversial remarks about Japans role in World War II. In the interview, he questioned the criminality of the Nanjing Massacre, claiming "It is not murder under international law to kill in war". Further, he compared the Nanjing Massacre with the atomic bombings of Japan by America and implied that if Japans war time actions were wrong then so were America's.  

He died of pneumonia on October 22, 2006.

References

|-

|-

|-

Anti-Korean sentiment in Japan
Education ministers of Japan
Government ministers of Japan
Members of the House of Representatives (Japan)
Sophia University alumni
Politicians from Tokyo
Nanjing Massacre deniers
1917 births
2006 deaths